Menchum is a department of Northwest Province in Cameroon. The department covers an area of 4469 km and as of 2005 had a total population of 161,998. The capital of the department lies at Wum.
The Menchum River drains this area, flowing westward into Nigeria to join the Benue River.

Subdivisions
The department is divided administratively into 5 communes and in turn into villages.

Communes 
 Benakuma
 Furu-Awa
 Wum
 Zhoa

References

Departments of Cameroon
Northwest Region (Cameroon)